The J. W. Danner House is a historic house located at 408 N. Fourth St. in Sayre, Oklahoma. J. W. Danner, one of the first landowners in Sayre, built the house for himself circa 1905; it is one of the city's oldest buildings. Danner built the house using triangular concrete blocks made from a block machine, a previously unseen construction style. He later used his home as a model for several other triangular block buildings in Sayre, giving the city a locally distinctive building style.

The house was added to the National Register of Historic Places on March 13, 2002.

References

Houses on the National Register of Historic Places in Oklahoma
Houses completed in 1905
Houses in Beckham County, Oklahoma
National Register of Historic Places in Beckham County, Oklahoma
1905 establishments in Oklahoma Territory